Queensland State Equestrian Centre is an equestrian sport venue located in Caboolture, Brisbane, Australia. It was opened in September 2011.

The facilities include:

An 80m x 40m indoor, sand arena with seating for 3,200 equestrian spectators or 5,200 for a concert, judges and commentators rooms and PA system
Warm up areas including a fully lit, 60m x 20m sand warm up arena
4 all-weather, sand dressage arenas with covered viewing areas 
154 stables with anti-slip rubber matting
8 wash bays
55 camp sites with power and water access
Camp sites (see below)
2 meeting/training rooms
A licensed bar

The Queensland State Equestrian Centre has 154 stables in close proximity to the camp sites, the main arena, warm up arena and dressage arenas.

Stable Facilities:

154 stables measuring 3.6m x 3.6m with anti-slip rubber matting and bitumen aisles 
Water and lighting in each aisle 
8 wash bays 
A dedicated vets room 
Horse waste bays 
A PA system link to the main arena 
Sawdust bedding

The Queensland State Equestrian Centre has 55 camp sites with water and power access as well as additional ‘informal’ camping spaces. The camp sites are split into three different sizes allowing for large horse trucks, camper vans and goosenecks through to smaller horse trucks and horse floats.  The width of all powered sites are 5.5m and the lengths vary from 16m to 25.5m.

Camping Facilities:

55 camp sites with power and water access 
Further unpowered camp sites 
A large amenities block toilets and showers
Camping reception

See also

Equestrian Australia
Sport in Brisbane
Sport in Queensland

References

External links
Official website

Sports venues in Brisbane
Equestrian venues
Sports venues completed in 2011
Indoor arenas in Australia
Equestrian sports in Australia